A.S. Roma Superleague Formula team was the racing team of A.S. Roma, a football team that competes in Italy in the Serie A. The A.S. Roma racing team competes in the Superleague Formula.

2008 season
In the 2008 Superleague Formula season Enrico Toccacelo was in the car for the first three rounds and Franck Perera was in for the last 3 rounds. The team's best finish was 2nd.

2009 season
For the 2009 Superleague Formula season Jonathan Kennard was  announced the driver in a surprise move. For the Estoril round of the season Alan Docking Racing replaced Azerti Motorsport in the running of the car and Franck Perera returned to the car.

Record
(key)

2008

2009
Super Final results in 2009 did not count for points towards the main championship.

2010

References

External links
 A.S. Roma Superleague Formula team minisite
 Official A.S. Roma football club website

A.S. Roma
Superleague Formula club teams
2008 establishments in Italy